Ebru Gündeş (born 12 October 1974) is a Turkish pop-folk and arabesque singer, actress, and television personality.

Early life
Ebru Gündeş was born in Istanbul. She attended primary school in Ankara, but she was forced to discontinue her education due to financial difficulty. She comes from a prominent religious Sunni Muslim family known for its military leaders.

The quality of her voice was discovered at an early age when one of her relatives took her to Neşe Demirkat, a partner in Raks Neşe Müzik, which is a record label in Turkey. Demirkat was impressed with her voice and introduced her to music producers Koral Sarıtaş and Selçuk Tekay.

Career
Ebru Gündeş sings the kind of desperately tragic Arabesque love songs that are the core of Turkish pop music.

Her debut album, Tanrı Misafiri, was released in 1992. It proved to be a massive success, selling 1,250,000 copies nationwide. At this stage, she was regarded as a very sweet and innocent-looking girl, slim, dressed in white and with an attractive habit of raising one eyebrow. She was on billboards all over Istanbul. Her subsequent albums have been hugely successful.

Gündeş released her fifth studio album Sen Allah'ın Bir Lütfusun in 1998. On 5 April 1998, the album ranked among the top 10 on MÜ-YAP's list of 50 best-selling albums, and on 25 April and 2 May it rose to the second position on the list of pop albums sold by Megavizyon and Mephisto music markets. For the album's first music video, Gündeş was accompanied by the Nigerian footballer and Fenerbahçe S.K. defender Uche Okechukwu. She has had serious health problems. She suffered from a cerebral haemorrhage in December 1999, while recording Dön Ne Olur. After two operations, Ebru eventually returned to full health. Dön Ne Olur was one of the best-selling albums of all time in Turkey. In November 2001, she released the album Ahdım Olsun. It was followed by Şahane (2003), Bize de Bu Yakışır (2004), Kaçak (2006) and Evet (2008).

Ebru Gündeş then released another album, Beyaz ("White"). The album, like most albums released that year, was unsuccessful, selling just over 100,000 throughout the year. In 2012, she released the album 13.5, which consisted only of covers of old popular songs. The album reached average sales in the country. However, the general perception of music critics had been one of disappointment, as the album consisted solely of covers and was therefore considered to be 'repetition'. In October 2014, her fourteenth studio album, Araftayım, was released. The album sold more than 100,000 copies.

Gündeş's fifteenth studio album Âşık was released by Blue Music on 31 January 2019. According to the data provided by Apple Music, it became the best-selling and most-downloaded album in Turkey on its day of release. The song "Aşık" also broke the record of the most downloaded song on its day of publication in Turkey. Three separate music videos were release for the songs "Âşık", "Gidiniz" and "Çabuk Unutma".

Television career
Ebru Gündeş has made hundreds of television appearances in Turkey as a singer and as an actress in the comedy series İmkansız Aşk (Impossible Love). She was also the host of Mega Show, which was one of the most popular television shows in Turkey. Every week Ebru was joined by a variety of other Turkish singers, most notably her long-time friends Serdar Ortaç and İbrahim Tatlıses. The show featured Ebru singing her own songs, singing classic songs and singing duets with other singers. She then appeared in the hugely popular singing contest Popstar Alaturka as a judge alongside some of Turkey's most popular singers, namely Bülent Ersoy and Orhan Gencebay and TV presenter Armağan Çağlayan. Just before leaving Popstar Alaturka, she released the album Evet (Yes).

In 2010, Gündeş who was presenting a television program on TGRT at the time, repeatedly performed a song based on verses from Ataol Behramoğlu's poem Yaşadıklarımdan öğrendiğim bir şey var, without asking permission or paying for the copyright. Behramoğlu later filed a lawsuit against Gündeş, the program's producer and broadcaster for violating his rights, asking for compensation due to material and moral damages.

She was also a judge on O Ses Türkiye (Turkish version of The Voice) between 2013 and 2016.

Personal life
At the age of 16 Gündeş married her first husband Hamdi Vardar. The couple later divorced, and in 2002 she married the lawyer Ömer Durak. Her third marriage was to Iranian Azerbaijani businessman Reza Zarrab in 2010. They have one daughter. Reza Zarrab was arrested on 17 December 2013 by Istanbul police in light of a corruption scandal, which involved some members of the AKP being accused of giving bribes totaling 63 million dollars to government ministers or their proxies. Ebru Gündeş reportedly filed for divorce in September 2016, but they reconciled shortly afterwards. In April 2021, Gündeş again filed for divorce. Their divorce was finalized on 7 May 2021.

Discography

Albums

Singles

Filmography

As actress

TV programs 
 Ebru ile Emrah Şov
 Ebru Gündeş'le İkinci Hayat
 Ebru Gündeş Mega Show
 Dön Ne Olur
 Popstar Alaturka
 O Ses Türkiye

References

External links

 
 

1974 births
Living people
Actresses from Istanbul
Singers from Istanbul
Turkish folk-pop singers
Turkish film actresses
Turkish television actresses
Turkish pop singers
Turkish Sunni Muslims
21st-century Turkish women singers